Falsacanthocinus brevis is a species of beetle in the family Cerambycidae, and the only species in the genus Falsacanthocinus. It was described by Fauvel in 1906.

References

Acanthocinini
Beetles described in 1906
Monotypic Cerambycidae genera